Janne Da Arc was a Japanese visual kei rock band, formed in Hirakata, Osaka in 1991. Although inactive since 2007, they officially announced that they had disbanded on April 1, 2019.

Career
The band is currently signed to the Motorod record label, which is owned by Avex Group. They have released three indie albums, nine major-label albums (including single collections), 26 singles, and 14 DVDs.

On May 9, 2006, they celebrated their tenth anniversary, the date marking when the final member, shuji, became an official member of the band. The band was not named after historical figure Joan of Arc, despite their song "Kyuuseishu (Messiah)" being about her - yasu named the band after a character in the manga Devilman by Go Nagai. A picture of the character can be seen on the art for the band's limited edition Janne Da Arc 10th Anniversary Indies Complete Box, released March 15, 2006.

Their sound is self-described as pop rock, but they played many musical styles such as alternative rock, progressive rock, hard rock and many others. Vocalist yasu takes many musical cues from his musical idol, Motoyuki "Morrie" Ōtsuka of the heavy metal band Dead End. However, the members of Janne Da Arc have proven themselves to be very versatile as well as proficient at their chosen instruments, and are influenced by many bands and musical styles.

As of January 26, 2007, the members of Janne Da Arc are pursuing solo projects, concurrent with their work in the band.

On May 19, 2009, they released a 10th Anniversary Complete Box Set.

On April 1, 2019, Janne Da Arc officially disbanded due to legal matters with their bassist, ka-yu, and health problems of their vocalist, yasu. The announcement was made by agency Uprise Product and elaborated on the circumstances of ka-yu's departure. It noted that during the time the band was preparing for an announcement of a new album and a live tour last September, it had received documents addressed to ka-yu from a law firm. The announcement continued on saying that "if the contents of the document were true," then it represented "acts that went against society and what was right." As a result of these documents, the band decided to cease activity with any projects related to ka-yu.

Members
 yasu (Yasunori Hayashi), vocalist, born January 27, 1975, in Hirakata, Osaka, Japan. Favorite artists include Dead End and Boøwy. yasu also plays the guitar and keyboard, the latter of which he uses to compose most of his music. In 2007 he started his solo project, Acid Black Cherry.
 you (Yutaka Tsuda), guitarist, born July 24, 1974, in Kobe, Japan. Favorite artists include Unicorn and Nuno Bettencourt.
 ka-yu (Kazuyuki Matsumoto), bassist, born January 21, 1975, in Hirakata, Osaka, Japan. Favorite artists include Crazy Cool Joe (Dead End bassist) and Boøwy. ka-yu is characterized by his more visual kei look in comparison to the rest of the band members. In 2010 he has announced the start of a new project called DAMIJAW, starting out with an album on April 28.
kiyo (Masanobu Kiyose), keyboardist, born June 27, 1974, in Hirakata, Osaka, Japan. Favorite artists include Earth, Wind, and Fire and Keith Emerson.
shuji (Shuji Suematsu), drummer, born November 21, 1974, in Kobe, Japan. Favorite artists include X Japan and Loudness.

All the members, with the exception of ka-yu, graduated from Hirakata West High School in the same class. For the release of their single Furimukeba..., Janne Da Arc returned to their high school to give a special performance, which became the feature film Hirakata.

Discography

Singles
"Red Zone" - March 19, 1999 / June 20, 2001
"Lunatic Gate" - September 22, 1999
 - January 13, 2000
"Heaven's Place/Vanity" - April 12, 2000 
 - June 26, 2000
"Mysterious" - November 8, 2000
"Dry?" - January 31, 2001
"Neo Venus" - April 25, 2001
"Seed" - July 25, 2001
 - October 24, 2001
"Feel the Wind" - December 12, 2001
"Shining Ray" - August 7, 2002
 - November 20, 2002
 - January 16, 2003
 - May 8, 2003
 - August 20, 2003
"Freedom" - March 24, 2004
"Kiss Me" - April 7, 2004
"Dolls" - May 19, 2004
"Romance" - May 26, 2004
"Black Jack" - June 2, 2004
"Love is Here" - November 17, 2004
 - January 19, 2005 - No. 2
 - May 18, 2005
/Destination" - February 8, 2006 - No. 2
"Heaven/" - May 10, 2006 - No. 2 Ranked Platinum (selling more than 250,000 copies) by RIAJ in 2008

EPs
 Dearly - April 17, 1998
 Resist - December 5, 1998
 Chaos Mode - March 17, 1999

Albums

Videos
 1999 Tour "Chaos Mode" (June 30, 1999)
 5 Stories <Clips & More> (September 27, 2000)
 Fate or Fortune: Live at Budokan (March 28, 2001)
 Six Clips (March 13, 2002)
 100th Memorial Live Live Infinity 2002 at Budokan (December 26, 2002)

DVDs
 1999 Tour "Chaos Mode" (September 27, 2000)
 5 Stories <Clips & More> (September 27, 2000)
 Fate or Fortune: Live at Budokan (March 28, 2001)
 Six Clips (March 13, 2002)
 100th Memorial Live: Live Infinity 2002 at Budokan (December 26, 2002)
 Another Story Clips (March 19, 2003)
 Singles Clips (November 12, 2003)
 Danjiri Night (December 25, 2003)
 Arcadia Clips (September 29, 2004)
 Hirakata (February 16, 2005)
 Live 2005 "Dearly" at Osaka-jō Hall 03.27 (March 27, 2005)
 10th Anniversary Special Live: Osaka Nanba Rockets 2006.5.9 (September 20, 2006)
 Live 2006 Dead or Alive: Saitama Super Arena 05.20 (September 20, 2006)
 Tour Joker 2005 at Budokan (March 25, 2009)

Blu-ray
 Tour Joker 2005 at Budokan (March 25, 2009)

Box sets
 Janne Da Arc 10th Anniversary Indies Complete Box (3CD, 1DVD) (March 15, 2006)
 Janne Da Arc Major Debut 10th Anniversary Complete Box (6CD, 3DVD) (May 19, 2009)

References

External links
 
 Avex's Janne Da Arc website 

Japanese alternative rock groups
Japanese hard rock musical groups
Japanese pop rock music groups
Japanese progressive rock groups
Musical groups established in 1991
Musical groups disestablished in 2019
Musical groups from Osaka
Visual kei musical groups